Bixby Creek is a stream in the U.S. state of Michigan.

See also 
 List of rivers of Michigan

References 

Rivers of Michigan
Rivers of Ogemaw County, Michigan